"Get Off" is a song by American disco band Foxy, released in 1978. The background vocals were performed by Wildflower. 
Released from their LP of the same name, the song became a crossover hit. It spent two weeks at number one on the Billboard Hot Soul Singles chart during the fall of that year and also peaked at number nine on the Billboard Hot 100 singles chart. Along with the track, "Tena's Song", "Get Off" peaked at number 18 on the disco chart.

Chart performance

References

Foxy (band) songs
Disco songs
1978 songs
1978 singles
Songs written by Ish Ledesma
TK Records singles